The Sky's the Limit is an album by the German Progressive metal band Horizon.

Track listing

Personnel
Patrick Hemer: guitars, vocals
Vinnie Angelo : keyboards and background vocals
Bruno J. Frank : bass and background vocals
Krissy Friedrich: drums and background vocals

References
KNAC.com 
Rock Hard 

2002 albums
Horizon (band) albums
Massacre Records albums